Spider-Man trilogy may refer to:

 Spider-Man (2002 film series)
 Spider-Man (2017 film series)